Beau Begley is a sportswriter and editor, currently working as sports anchor for KTSM-TV in El Paso, Texas.  He is considered a local expert on sports in the area including the University of Texas-El Paso athletic programs.

References

External links
 Beau Bagley Official bio

American sports journalists